The House at 916 Preston Avenue in Thompson Falls, Montana was built in 1911–12.  It was listed on the National Register of Historic Places in 1986.

It was a one-story Bungalow/craftsman-style house.  It was built by contractor Charles H. Doenges, who built at least 17 houses in Thompson Falls.

Its first occupant was probably Irving E. Keith, bookkeeper for the Thompson Falls Mercantile Company.  Keith sold the house in 1922 to E. L. Stackpole, the County Treasurer.

References

Houses on the National Register of Historic Places in Montana
Houses completed in 1912
National Register of Historic Places in Sanders County, Montana
1912 establishments in Montana
Bungalow architecture in Montana
Thompson Falls, Montana